Dargiran (also Romanized as Dargīrān; also known as Darigīrān) is a village in Siyahu Rural District, Fin District, Bandar Abbas County, Hormozgan Province, Iran. At the 2006 census, its population was 43, in 12 families.

References 

Populated places in Bandar Abbas County